Archidendron pauciflorum, commonly known as djenkol, jengkol or jering is a species of flowering tree in the pea family, Fabaceae. It is native to Southeast Asia, where the seeds are a popular dish. They are mainly consumed in Indonesia, Thailand, Myanmar, and Vietnam and prepared by frying, boiling, or roasting and are also eaten raw. The beans are mildly toxic due to the presence of djenkolic acid, an amino acid which causes djenkolism (djenkol bean poisoning). The beans and leaves of the djenkol tree are traditionally used for medicinal purposes such as purifying the blood. To date, djenkol is traded on local markets only.

Vernacular names 
Common English names are blackbead, dog fruit, djenkol tree, luk nieng tree and ngapi nut. As this plant grows in different countries in South-East Asia, it has a variety of vernacular names. The common names in Indonesia is djenkol tree, jinkol, jarung (Sumatra) or jering (Java). It is called krakos in Cambodia, jering in Malaysia and in Thailand. Other vernacular names include luk nieng, cha niang, khang daeng and pha niang. In Myanmar it is called da-nyin-thee or da-nyin-pen.

Description
Archidendron pauciflorum is a legume tree with a size of 18–25 m, has spreading crown and bipinnate leaves (up to 25 cm) and greyish smooth bark. The young leaves have a wine-red colour and are edible. Flowering time of the tree is between September and January. The white calyx cup-shaped flowers are bisexual and have various yellowish-white stamens.

The fruit (legume) of the tree is a woody, glabrous and deep purple pod. Each Pod contains around three to nine round-shaped seeds. The pods are formed falcate or twisted in a wide spiral. The seed coat of a young seed shows a yellow-green colour and turns into dark brown during ripening. Then the ripe fruit dehisces along the ventral suture.

Habitat and ecology 
The tree is indigenous to primary and secondary forests in humid, mountainous and undulating areas as well as on river banks from sea-level up to 1600 m altitude in Southeast Asian countries such as Bangladesh, Indonesia (Sumatra, Sulawesi, Kalimantan), Malaysia, Myanmar and Southern Thailand. Djenkol trees grow best in pervious sandy or lateritic soils and they need a high rainfall guaranty.

Uses

Culinary Use

Nutritional value 

The beans of the Djenkol tree have a crude carbohydrate content of about 26% which is relatively low compared to other common legumes, such as cowpea, kidney bean and pea which all contain about 60 - 70%. The crude protein content instead is about 14.2%. This is higher than that of common cereals, such as wheat (13%), rye (11%) or rice (7%). The presence of adequate protein and low fat contents might be perceived as desirable by consumers. When processed to flour, the presence of high moisture content (about 59%) suggests that this seed needs to be further processed to improve the shelf life and the overall quality.

Ways of preparation 

Djenkol beans are 3.0 to 3.5 cm in diameter and 1.5 to 2.0 cm thick and have a reddish-brown color. These beans are prepared by frying, boiling, or roasting and are also eaten raw. They are mainly consumed in Thailand, Malaysia, Myanmar, and Indonesia. The seeds of djenkol are mainly used to add flavour to food, although the crushed seeds give off a mild sulfurous odor which is perceived as rather offensive by some people. Young seeds are often eaten raw as so-called ulam. Mature seeds are prepared in different ways:

 boiled thoroughly until the bad smell has disappeared, then consumed with salt and grated coconut.
 steeped in salted water for some hours, then fried in oil. This also removes most of the offensive smell.
 The seeds can be buried for about 14 days until they germinate. Then they are dug up and eaten after the sprout has been removed. This way of preparation is said to minimize the danger of intoxication by jengkolic acid.

Folk medicine 
Different parts of the djenkol tree are applied in traditional medicine of Southeast Asia. The raw seeds are thought to purify the blood or cure dysentery. Compresses with young leaves are used for skin problems, and burnt old leaves are believed to relieve itchy feelings. The powder of burnt young leaves are applied to cuts and wounds.

Other uses 
Archidendron pauciflorum can also be used for dyeing. The pods of the seeds dye silk purple and the bark of the tree dyes black. The shell is also being used for hair washing, timber as firewood and for building (e.g. coffins). Due to the content of djenkolic acids in the seeds, the raw seed is also being applied to the production of organic pesticides in combination with other plants to kill and prevent the growth of pests.

Cultivation

Forms of cultivation 
Djenkol trees have often been spared when primary or secondary rain forest has been cut down. Otherwise planting distances are 10–15 m. The plant favours a well-drained sandy, lateritic or sandy clay soil.  is propagated by Seed. Methods for clonal distribution are not yet been found. In nature Squirrels (Callosciurus notatus) eat the seeds and facilitate its distribution.

Harvest and post-harvest treatment 
A tree produces between 1000 and 4000 seeds per year. The main harvesting time in Java is around July to August, the aftercrop in December to February. Usually Djenkol is sold in the markets by number of seeds. For transport, seeds, in particular young ones, should not be removed from the pods to avoid desiccation. One way to store the seeds is by processing it into chips (emping). Another possibility however could be its procession to flour. To date, due to the high moisture content, this is hardly done.

Pests and diseases 
Archidendron pauciflorum has a number of pests in common with other leguminous trees and shrubs such as the pod-borers Mussidia pectinicornella and Cryptophlebia ombrodelta or the caterpillars of the leaf-feeder Eurema blanda, one of the most common butterflies in Java.

References

pauciflorum
Edible legumes
Medicinal plants of Asia
Flora of tropical Asia
Plant dyes
Potentially dangerous food